The following categories indicate the most prominent film Awards and honours won by Girish Kasaravalli

National Film Awards
National Film Award for Best Feature Film
1977: Ghatashraddha
1986: Tabarana Kathe
1997: Thaayi Saheba
2001: Dweepa

National Film Award for Best Experimental Film
 1975: Avashesh

National Film Award – Special Jury Award / Special Mention (Non-Feature Film)
 2013: Ananthamurthy – Not A Biography...But A Hypothesis

National Film Award for Best Film on Family Welfare
2005: Hasina

National Film Award for Best Screenplay
2009: Kanasemba Kudureyaneri

National Film Award for Best Feature Film in Kannada
1988: Bannada Vesha
1989: Mane
1995: Kraurya
2007: Gulabi Talkies
2009: Kanasemba Kudureyaneri
2011: Koormavatara

International honours
South Asian Cinema Foundation's 'Excellence in Cinema' Crystal Globe Award 2009

Ghatashraddha - 1977
The Catholic Jury Award
Ducats Award at the Manneham Film Festival Germany

Akramana - 1979
Won the "Moitra award" at the Asian Film Festival at Jakarta, Indonesia
Was screened at the Asian and Cairo Film Festivals

Dweepa - 2001
Won Best film at Moscow film festival

Hasina - 2004
Best Film With a Social Issues at Asia Pacific Film Festival Berlin
Best Film script and Best film of Human Interest at Barcelona film festival

Naayi Neralu - 2006
Best Film At KARA International Film Festival, Karachi
Best Indian Film at Osian's Cinefan Jury award
Best Indian Film at MAMI International Film Festival Mumbai

Gulabi Talkies - 2007
Best Indian Film At Osian's Cinefan Festival of Asian & Arab Cinema                                 
Jury Award at Asian Film Festival, Vesoul
Best Script at Lavente Film Festival Italy

Kanasemba Kudureyaneri - 2009
Best Film At Asiatica Filmmediale. Rome
NETPAC Award at Asiatica Filmediale, Rome
INALCO Jury Award Asian Film Festival, Vesoul
Screened at Imagine India Film Festival Madrid

Illiralare Allige Hogalare - 2020
Director’s Vision Award 2021 at the 18th Indian Film Festival Stuttgart (Germany)
Best Child Actor at Imagineindia Film Festival, Madrid (Spain)
Best Film (Critic) At Rome International Film Festival

Karnataka State Film Awards
Ghatashraddha - 1977-78
Best Film
Best Director
Best Script

Mooru Darigalu - 1981-82
Second Best Film
Best Director
Best Script

Tabarana Kathe - 1986-87
Best Film
Best Direction

Mane - 1989-90
Special Jury Award
Best Script

Kraurya - 1995-96
Second Best Film
   
Thaayi Saheba - 1997-98
Best Film
Best Director

Dweepa - 2001-02
Best Film
Best Director

Hasina - 2004-05
Best Film On Social Issues

Naayi Neralu - 2005-06
Best Film
Best Director

Gulabi Talkies - 2007-08
Best Film
Best Director
Best Script

Koormavatara - 2011
Second Best Film

Puttanna Kanagal Award - 1997-98

Filmfare Awards South
Thaayi Saheba - 1998
Best Film
Best Direction

Dweepa - 2006
Best Film
Best Direction

Kanasemba Kudureyaneri - 2009
Best Direction

See also
Parallel cinema

References

External links
https://web.archive.org/web/20120402031952/http://biffes.in/2ndBiffes2008.html
http://entertainment.oneindia.in/kannada/news/2012/girish-kasaravalli-kurmavatara-national-award-070312.html

Lists of awards received by Indian film director